The  is a professional chamber orchestra, founded in 1988, based in Kanazawa, Ishikawa, Japan, and is a full member of the Association of Japanese Symphony Orchestras. The Orchestra's home is Ishikawa Ongakudō (Ishikawa Music Hall). Since 2007, its music director is Michiyoshi Inoue.

Activities
The Orchestra performs more than 100 concerts every year.  In 1992, the Orchestra's CD "合奏協奏曲第1番(シュニトケ)、カルメン組曲(ビゼー" (Concerto Grosso No. 1 by Schnittke and Carmen by Bizet) received the Japan Record Academy Award. In 1994, the Orchestra's CD "21世紀へのメッセージ" (Message for 21st Century) published by Polydor Kabushiki Kaisha received Artistic Work Award from Agency for Cultural Affairs of Japan. In 1995, the Orchestra received the Grand Prize of Idemitsu Music Prize for 1994.  In 1995, the Orchestra's CD "21世紀へのメッセージ vol. 2" (Message for 21st Century vol. 2)  received the Japan Record Academy Award.

In 2008, it performed 128 concerts including seven overseas concerts, making it the 11th largest Japanese orchestra in terms of concert revenue.  On January 7, 2010, the Orchestra's home Ishikawa Music Hall received the Internal Minister's Prize from Japan Foundation for Regional Art Activities for the collaboration with the Orchestra to promote art in the region.  In 2005, the Orchestra's CD of Mozart piano concerto featuring pianist Yoko Kikuchi received the Music Pen Club Award.

Music director／Artistic Chef 

Hiroyuki Iwaki (1988–2006)
Michiyoshi Inoue (2007–2018)
Marc Minkowski (2018-)

Composer-in-residence
 Toshi Ichiyanagi (1988–1991)
 Maki Ishii (1988–1991)
 Yūzō Toyama (1991–1992)
 Akira Nishimura (1992–1993)
 Joji Yuasa (1993–1995)
 Tōru Takemitsu (1995–1996)
 Toshiro Mayuzumi (1996–1997)
 Shin-ichiro Ikebe (1997–1998)
 Keiko Fujiie (1998–1999)
 Hikaru Hayashi (1999–2000)
 Tetsuji Emura (2000–2001)
 Teizo Matsumura (2001–2002)
 Akira Miyoshi (2002–2003)
 Toshirō Saruya (2003–2004)
 Atsuhiko Gondai (2004–2005)
 Lera Auerbach (2004–2005)
 Michio Mamiya (2005–2006)
 Tokuhide Niimi (2006–2007)
 Toshi Ichiyanagi (2007–2008)
 Shigeaki Saegusa (2008–2009)
 Roger Boutry (2009–2010)
 Takashi Kako (2010–2011)
Kei Mochizuki (2011–2012)
Unsuk Chin (2012–2014)
Atsuhiko Gondai (2014-2015)
Toshi Ichiyanagi (2015-2016)
Thierry Escaich (2016-2017)
Shin’ichirō Ikebe (2017-2018)
Miho Hazama (2018-2019)

References

External links
Official OEK website
  Official OEK website

Musical groups established in 1988
Japanese orchestras
Kanazawa
Musical groups from Ishikawa Prefecture